Esther Jane "Jennie" Hobart ( Tuttle; April 30, 1849 – January 8, 1941) was the wife of Vice President Garret Hobart and a philanthropist and community activist in New Jersey.

Biography

Born and raised in Paterson, New Jersey, Hobart was the daughter of the prominent attorney Socrates Tuttle and his wife, Jane Winters. She married Garret Hobart in Paterson on July 21, 1869, at the start of his career as a lawyer and politician. They had four children, two of whom died in childhood. The other two were Garret Jr. and Fannie, who died in 1895. In 1896 her husband was elected Vice President of the United States and the family moved to Washington, D.C. As the second lady of the United States, Hobart often served as White House hostess because the first lady, Ida Saxton McKinley, suffered from epilepsy.  Vice President Hobart died of heart failure on November 21, 1899. After his death, she returned to Paterson and became involved in community affairs. She was a close friend of Mrs. McKinley and rushed to Buffalo, New York, to offer her support when President McKinley was shot in September 1901.

During the American women's suffrage movement, Hobart positioned herself as definitively anti-suffrage.  She organized the New Jersey Association Opposed to Woman Suffrage and held regular meetings.

Hobart died of pneumonia on January 8, 1941, in Haledon, New Jersey, where she had been living on her son's farm, and was buried in Cedar Lawn Cemetery in Paterson, New Jersey.

References

External links
 
New Jersey Women's History

1849 births
1941 deaths
Burials at Cedar Lawn Cemetery
Deaths from pneumonia in New Jersey
People from Haledon, New Jersey
People from Paterson, New Jersey
Second ladies of the United States
Spouses of New Jersey politicians
Anti-suffragists